The Spanish Anarchists: The Heroic Years, 1868–1936 is a history of anarchism in Spain prior to its late 1930s civil war and social revolution written by anarchist Murray Bookchin and published in 1976 by Free Life Press.

Further reading

External links 

 

1976 non-fiction books
American history books
History books about Spain
Anarchism in Spain
English-language books
Works by Murray Bookchin
History books about anarchism